Scoil Mhuire is an Irish co-educational post-primary school owned by the Irish government and controlled by a board of management with ten members: two parents, two teachers, and six representatives from the trustees who are Kildare V.E.C. and the Presentation Sisters.

The Presentation Sisters founded the secondary school, which was changed to community school status in 1983 when the school moved into the present building. They have completed an extension and sports hall to the school.

On 8 April 2016 enrollment was over 1000 students (with a roughly 50:50 ratio of boys and girls, aged 12 to 18) and a teaching staff of more than 70.

The school operates the Transition Year, the Leaving Cert Applied and the Leaving Cert Vocational Programmes. Students also pursue programmes in physical education and religious studies. Students are encouraged to involve themselves in extracurricular activities, both indoor and outdoor.

Adult education is promoted at Scoil Mhuire, which is one of the largest adult education schools in the country.

Transition year
All of the students are in school everyday and take classes such as social and political, information technology, journalism, and drama, as well as all of the core subjects: English, mathematics, language. They also can sample optional subjects for the Leaving Certificate, such as history, art, music, geography. Transition year students take part in work experiences every Friday in at least two different workplaces. The students are given the responsibility of finding their own places of work for the year. Every year there is a Transition Year UK tour, featuring a trip to Alton Towers.

Notable alumni
Eoghan Corry - columnist, author, and founder of the Gaelic Athletic Association Museum located at Croke Park, Dublin, Ireland

References

External links
School website
Story of Presentation Sisters in Clane

Secondary schools in County Kildare
Presentation Sisters schools
Community schools in the Republic of Ireland
1961 establishments in Ireland
Educational institutions established in 1961